The Flight of Arno Jessen (German:Die Flucht des Arno Jessen) is a 1918 German silent film directed by Richard Eichberg and starring Ernst Rückert, Eva Speyer and Hermann Seldeneck.

Cast
 Ernst Rückert 
 Eva Speyer 
 Hermann Seldeneck 
 Ellen Richter
 Franz Werter 
 Walter Tostary

References

Bibliography
 Hans-Michael Bock and Tim Bergfelder. The Concise Cinegraph: An Encyclopedia of German Cinema. Berghahn Books.

External links

1918 films
Films directed by Richard Eichberg
German silent feature films
Films of the German Empire
German black-and-white films
1910s German films